Carlyle Oliveira Porto, (born September 5, 1981) 
is an actor and Brazilian model.

Biography 

At age 15, he moved with his family to Salvador and with 23 lived in São Paulo, where he currently lives. He has also served as a model and stamped several fashion magazines and advertising campaigns.

His first television appearance was in Rede Globo, in 2008, when he made a special appearance in the series Casos e Acasos, as Eliseu.

He has also made special guest appearances in the novel Caras e Bocas (2009) and in the series A Vida Alheia (2010). He lived the character Vitorio Emanuele in the novel Passione, in 2010, Nikko in "Salve Jorge", which aired in 2013, and Dr. Eduardo Tavares in Alto Astral.

In 2016 Carlo Porto, won the role of adult protagonist in Carinha de Anjo, novel of the SBT. In the plot, lives the personage Gustavo Larios a man traumatized with the fatal accident of Tereza, (Lucero) his great love, then decides to maintain the daughter in a boarding school and under the care of the cousin Estefânia (Priscilla Sol).

In 2018, he participated in the series  Onde Nascem os Fortes  interpreting the character Cecílio, affair of Rosinete, lived by Debora Bloch. In the same year he leverages his international career, with a debut in the first year of his career. Portuguese novel Alma e Coração where it interprets Luis Carvalhais.

Filmography

Television

Awards and nominations

References

External links

 
 Carlo Porto On Facebook

Brazilian male telenovela actors
Brazilian male film actors
1981 births
Living people
People from Governador Valadares
Brazilian television presenters